The fourth competition weekend of the 2013–14 ISU Speed Skating World Cup was held in Sportforum Hohenschönhausen in Berlin, Germany, from Friday, 6 December, until Sunday, 8 December 2013.

There were no new world records this weekend, but the Dutch women's team, comprised by Marrit Leenstra, Jorien ter Mors and Ireen Wüst, set a new low-altitude team pursuit record of 2:58.19, as they skated the fastest time recorded on any rink outside Calgary and Salt Lake City.

Schedule
The detailed schedule of events:

All times are CET (UTC+1).

Medal summary

Men's events

Women's events

Standings
The top ten standings in the contested cups after the weekend. The top five nations in the team pursuit cups.

Men's cups
500 m

1000 m

1500 m

5000/10000 m

Team pursuit

Grand World Cup

Women's cups
500 m

1000 m

1500 m

3000/5000 m

Team pursuit

Grand World Cup

References

 
4
Isu World Cup, 2013-14, 4
Speed skating in Berlin
2013 in Berlin